Kanara Catholic Association (KCA),  is one of the reputed cultural organisations of the Mangalorean Catholic community in India.

KCA's vision is to promote educational, spiritual and cultural activities. A scholarship corpus fund started in the 1960s, has facilitated financial assistance even to this day, to several deserving students of the Mangalorean Catholic Community in Bangalore.

KCA is a major contributor in terms of land and funds to the Konkan Samudai Bhavan (KSB), which is a state of the art building to help members of the Kanara Catholic Community. One of the major aims of the KSB is to provide highly subsidised accommodations for Catholic youth who come from the Konkan area to Bangalore in search of jobs or help in the early part of their careers. The KSB is also there to help the Kanara Catholic Community to host their cultural events and other events to ensure the progress of the community.

In a Landmark event, during the Annual General Body meeting of 2018, the Chief Postmaster General of Karnataka, Government of India, His Excellency, Dr. Charles Lobo, in the presence of members and the newly elected committee, released a stamp commemorating the Monti Fest Festival of the Mangalorean catholics, which is celebrated worldwide by the community on 8 September to honour the Virgin Mary and is connected to the Harvest festival which is also celebrated in India with great gusto.

In December 2018, KCA presented Faye D'Souza, the Editor of Mirrow Now, the 'Face of the Year Award' presented by His Excellency, Bishop Henry D'Souza of Bellary.

Background
KCA Bangalore was started in 1955 thanks to the initiative of early residents Leo D'Silva, Public Notary and John D'Sa, who was later Chief Engineer of the Karnataka State Government Electricity Board and Capt. Dr. George Mathias - a well-known coffee planter. The early meetings were in the legendary Oorgaum House, the home of Rajpramukh PG D'Souza. Its mission was to promote cohesiveness and camaraderie within the community through social events, picnics and sports.  KCA  became a Registered body in 1988. The membership and Articles of Association were revised in 1994.

The Annual General Body Meeting of KCA has traditionally included a Church Service in Konkani, followed by lunch and entertainment. From 1993, an annual church service  for Departed Members, Thanksgiving Mass in April after Easter, and Montichefest Mass in September with well-organized liturgy and choir is always conducted without fail.  Cultural events have evolved  from modest social gatherings in the 1950s, which introduced a touch of culture with the colourful mando, to 1995, when a cultural troupe from Mangalore led by Bennet Pinto were invited to perform at the 40th Anniversary celebration of KCA at St. Germains School, Bangalore. Cultural programmes have become a rallying force to bring the community together to participate, have fellowship, celebrate and contribute to charity causes. From 2000 onwards, "Mango Showers" and later  Mood Manglowrean  have showcased  Mangalorean cultural heritage through skits, plays, music, dance and songs with large numbers of cultural events to promote the cohesion of the Mangalorean catholic community, which  has been decreasing in numbers  in India.

KCA also publishes a quarterly Newsletter called 'Khobar' from 1994. In 1995, the first Directory of Members was published.  A Land and Building Fund was instituted in 1985 to harness donations from the community for charitable causes, resulting in a plot of land purchased 10 years later. Raising funds for a building turned out to be a major hurdle. In 2016, through the herculean efforts of the Konkan Welfare Trust- a joint collaboration of KCA and KONCAB, and substantial assistance from many individual benefactors both in India and across the World,  a magnificent community building consisting of a hall and hostel called the Konkan Samudai Bhavan was completed.

A tradition is also the annual Thanksgiving Mass,  held every year, after Easter.  Donations and proceeds from this mass are given to other catholic organisations who cater to less privileged members of society.  In the last few years, donations from these masses have been given to  the Little Sisters of the Poor, the Leprosy Home at Sumanahally Bangalore, the home for AIDS patients on Sarjapur Road run by the Camillian Fathers, Asha Niketan Koramangala a home for the intellectually disabled, part of the L'Arch communities started by Jean Vanier in France in 1970 and others

The KCA celebrated its golden jubilee in 2004-2005 under the stewardship of the first Lady President of KCA, Dr. Pat Pinto.

Committee

The KCA is run by an Honorary Committee which is elected by the AGM every year. Committee members are responsible for organising all the KCA events, with all the proceeds going to charity.

References

Social groups of Karnataka
Christianity in Karnataka
Indian Roman Catholics
Konkani
Catholics
Catholicism
Christian communities of India
Ethnic groups in India
Ethnicities of Karnataka
Ethnoreligious groups in India